Ilie Năstase and Rosie Casals were the defending champions, but lost in the semifinals to Owen Davidson and Billie Jean King.

Davidson and King defeated Marty Riessen and Margaret Court in the final, 3–6, 6–2, 15–13 to win the mixed doubles tennis title at the 1971 Wimbledon Championships.

Nirupama Mankad became the first Indian woman in the open era to play the main draw (and ultimately win a match) at a Grand Slam event.

Seeds

  Marty Riessen /  Margaret Court (final)
  Ilie Năstase /  Rosie Casals (semifinals)
  Owen Davidson /  Billie Jean King (champions)
  Frew McMillan /  Judy Dalton (semifinals)

Draw

Finals

Top half

Section 1

Section 2

Section 3

Section 4

Bottom half

Section 5

Section 6

Section 7

Section 8

References

External links

1971 Wimbledon Championships – Doubles draws and results at the International Tennis Federation

X=Mixed Doubles
Wimbledon Championship by year – Mixed doubles